WiGLE (or Wireless Geographic Logging Engine) is a website for collecting information about the different wireless hotspots around the world. Users can register on the website and upload hotspot data like GPS coordinates, SSID, MAC address and the encryption type used on the hotspots discovered. In addition, cell tower data is uploaded and displayed.

By obtaining information about the encryption of the different hotspots, WiGLE tries to create an awareness of the need for security by running a wireless network.

The first recorded hotspot on WiGLE was uploaded in September 2001. By June 2017, WiGLE counted over 349 million recorded WiFi networks in its database, whereof 345 million was recorded with GPS coordinates and over 4.8 billion unique recorded observations. In addition, the database now contains 7.80 million unique cell towers including 7.75 million with GPS coordinates. By May 2019, WiGLE had a total of 551 million networks recorded.

Mentions in books
From Hacking for Dummies to Introduction to Neography, WiGLE is a well known resource and tool. As early as 2004, its database of 228,000 wireless networks was being used to advocate better security of Wifi. Several books mentioned the WiGLE database in 2005, including internationally, and the association with vehicles was also becoming widely known. Some associations of WiGLE have been positive, and some have been darker. By 2004, the site was sufficiently well known that the announcement of a new book quoted the co-founder, saying “This is the ‘Kama Sutra’ of wardriving literature. If you can't wardrive after reading this, nature has selected you not to. This is the first complete guide on the subject we’ve ever seen (it mentions us). Don't quote me on that.”
–Bob “bobzilla” Hagemann, WiGLE.net CoFounder" and a shortened quote appeared on the book's cover.

Mentions in academic papers
In early days, circa 2003 the lack of mapping was criticized, and was said to force WiFi seekers to use more primitive methods. "The most primitive method disseminated is warchalking, where mappers inscribe a symbolic markup on the physical premises to indicate the presence of a wireless network in the area." Regarding WiGLE in particular, it was said, "The Netstumbler map site and the Wireless Geographic Logging Engine store more detailed wardrive trace data, yet do not offer any visualization format that is particularly useful or informative." By 2004 others felt differently, however, and a WiFi news site said about "the fine folks at wigle.net who have 900,000 access points in their wardriving database," "While the maps aren't as pretty, they're quite good, and the URLs correspond to specific locations where WiFiMaps hides the URL-to-location mapping." In late 2004, other authors stated, "that war driving is now ubiquitous: a good illustration of this is provided by the WiGLE.net online database of WAPS." They also said, "The motherload of WAP maps is available on the Wireless Geographic Logging Engine Web site (wigle.net). Circa late September 2004, WiGLE’s database and mapping technology included over 1.6 million WAPS. If you can’t find the WAP of interest there, you can probably live without it." In 2005, using WiFi databases for geolocation was being discussed, and WiGLE, with approximately 2.4 million located access points in the database, was often mentioned.

Licensing
Although the apps used to collect information are open sourced, the database itself is accessed and distributed under a freeware proprietary license. Commercial use of parts of the data may be bought.
The Android app to collect Wi-Fi hotspots and their geographic correspondent information is available under a 3-clause BSD license.

See also
Cell ID
Geolocation software
KisMAC
Kismet
Location as a service
Mozilla Location Service
Navizon
NetStumbler
Skyhook Wireless
Wardriving
Wi-Fi positioning system

References

External links
WiGLE Main Page
WiGLE Forums

Wireless networking